Tofilau Eti Alesana, AC, born Aualamalefalelima Alesana (4 June 1924 – 19 March 1999) was a Samoan politician who served as the fifth prime minister of Samoa from 1982 to 1985, and again from 1988 until his resignation in 1998.

Biography

Background 
Alesana was born in Vaitogi, Tutuila, American Samoa into a Samoan upper-class family. At the age of 24, he became a clan chief.

Political career 
In 1957 he was elected to the legislative council, and in 1958 he became health minister. He helped draft the constitution for the newly independent state of Western Samoa. Alesana helped form the Human Rights Protection Party which won power in 1982. Alesana served as prime minister for the first time from 1982 until 1985 when he was deposed by Parliament with the help of disgruntled members of his own party. He regained control of the party in 1988 and became prime minister. Alesana led the party to almost complete control of the country, with more than a 2/3 majority in the Parliament. In 1997 Alesana's government changed the country's name from Western Samoa to Samoa.

Alesana began to suffer from health problems in the 1990s, finally resigning as Prime Minister in November 1998 but remained a member of Cabinet as Minister Without Portfolio until his death in the capital, Apia. His party would go on to hold power until 2021. Alesana was also Minister of Foreign Affairs of Samoa from 1984 to 1985 and from 1988 to 1998.

Family 
Tofilau was born to Samoan upper-class parents, Reverend James Alesana Fai'ivae and Vaoita Iosefa Mala'itai. He was the first of a prominent political family in both Samoas. He was the uncle of former Governor of American Samoa, Tauese Sunia as well as the former U.S. Congressional Representative Fofō Iosefa Fiti Sunia, the former Lt. Governor of American Samoa, Faoa Aitofele Sunia and a second cousin of former American Samoa Congressional representative, Eni Faleomavaega.

His wife was Pitolua Alesana. Alesana's son, Tautua Samoa Party President Va'aelua Eti Alesana, died in 2011.

Honours
Alesana was awarded the Queen Elizabeth II Coronation Medal in 1953, and the New Zealand 1990 Commemoration Medal. On 6 July 1994, he was appointed an honorary Companion of the Order of Australia, for "eminent service to Australian/Western Samoan relations and to South Pacific multilateral relations".

References

External links
Tapuitea: Historical Notes, page 7, brief biography of Alesana

Members of the Legislative Assembly of Samoa
1924 births
1999 deaths
Prime Ministers of Samoa
Deputy Prime Ministers of Samoa
Foreign ministers of Samoa
Health ministers of Samoa
Honorary Companions of the Order of Australia
Samoan chiefs
Human Rights Protection Party politicians
Government ministers of Samoa
People from Western District, American Samoa
20th-century Samoan politicians